is a Japanese former mixed martial arts (MMA) fighter, Sambo, submission grappling and Brazilian jiu-jitsu black belt practitioner.

In MMA, Shioda is a Shooto Grappling Flyweight Champion. A two-time Pan IBJJF Champion in the lower belt jiu-jitsu divisions, Shioda is an ADCC Submission Fighting World Champion, a Sambo World Champion and a three-time IBJJF World Jiu-Jitsu Championship medallist.

Career 
Sayaka Shioda was born in Itakurai Ora, Gunma, Japan, she is a black belt in Brazilian jiu-jitsu (BJJ), Judo and Sambo. She started MMA in 2005 fighting as a Flyweight with three pro fights that year in Pancrase and Shooto, that same year she won silver at the 2005 Pan Jiu-Jitsu IBJJF Championship competing as a lightweight, in a combined purple/brown/black category. In 2007 she won the ADCC Asian Championships in Tokyo, Japan in the 55 kg category thus qualifying for the World Championship.

Shioda won the 2007 ADCC World Championship after defeating Cynthia Hales in the quarter final, Bianca Baretto in the semi and Felicia Oh in the final. That same year she won silver at the 2007 IBJJF World Jiu-Jitsu Championship losing to Laurence Cousin in the final. The following year she won bronze in the 2008 IBJJF World openweight after losing to Kyra Gracie; she won silver in her weight class at the 2009 IBJJF World after being submitted by Bianca Andrade in the final with just a few second left.

At the 2009 ADCC World Championship Shioda came second in the -60 kg division, after defeating Bianca Andrade and Hillary Williams but losing to Luanna Alzuguir in the final. In 2010 Shioda faced Rikako Yuasa during DEEP X 05, submitting her in 22 seconds.

In 2012, Shioda qualified for the Abu Dhabi World Brazilian jiu-jitsu Pro during the trials organised in Tokyo, competing in the light division. Fighting under team Abe Ani Combat Club (AACC) at the 2012 World IBJJF Jiu-Jitsu No-Gi Championship she won bronze after losing to Ana Carolina Vidal of Gracie Humaita in the semi-final.

In March 2013, she participated to the 2nd ADCC Asia trials taking place in Tokyo, finishing second in the -60 kg category after Seiko Yamamoto. In October 2013 she returned to MMA for the third edition of Real Fight Championship in the under 56 kg category, defeating the Chinese Jin Tang in the first round.

Championships and accomplishments

Submission Grappling 
Main Achievements:
 ADCC Submission Fighting World Champion (2007)
 ADCC Asian Champion (2007)
 2nd place ADCC Asian Championship (2013)
 2nd place ADCC Submission Fighting World Championship (2009)

Brazilian jiu-jitsu 
Main Achievements (black belt):
 2nd place IBJJF World Championship (2009 2007)
 2nd place IBJJF World No-Gi Championship (2012)
 3rd place IBJJF World Championship (2008)
Main Achievements (coloured belts):
 IBJJF Pan American Champion (2006 purple / 2004 blue)
 JBJJF All Japan Brazilian Jiu-Jitsu Champion (2005)
 2nd place IBJJF Pan Championship (2005)
 2nd place IBJJF Asian Championship (2006 purple)
 3rd place JBJJF All Japan Brazilian Jiu-Jitsu Championship (2005)

Sambo 
Main Achievements:
 3rd place World Sambo Championship (2008)
 All Japan Sambo Women's 66 kg Champion (2005)

MMA 
 All Japan Shooto Grappling Championship – Women's Flyweight Champion (2004)
 All Japan Amateur Shooto – Women's Bantamweight Champion (2004)

Mixed martial arts record 

|-
| Win
| align=center| 4–1
| Jin Tang
| Submission (kneebar)
| Real Fight MMA Championship 3
| 
| align=center| 1
| align=center| 0:57
| Beijing, China
|
|-
| Win
| align=center| 3–1
| Asuka Ito
| Decision (unanimous)
| Pancrase – Blow 5
| 
| align=center| 3
| align=center| 3:00
| Tokyo, Japan
|
|-
| Loss
| align=center| 2–1
| Tomomi Sunaba
| TKO (head kick and punches)
| Pancrase – Spiral 10
| 
| align=center| 1
| align=center| 2:14
| Tokyo, Japan
|
|-
| Win
| align=center| 2–0
| Emi Kuroda
| Submission (heel hook)
| Pancrase – Z
| 
| align=center| 1
| align=center| 0:44
| Kumamoto, Japan
|
|-
| Win
| align=center| 1–0
| Seri Saito
| Submission (reverse triangle choke)
| G-Shooto – G-Shooto 02
| 
| align=center| 1
| align=center| 3:59
| Tokyo, Japan
|

Notes

References 

Japanese practitioners of Brazilian jiu-jitsu
Living people
People awarded a black belt in Brazilian jiu-jitsu
Female Brazilian jiu-jitsu practitioners
Japanese submission wrestlers
Date of birth missing (living people)